Almara is a village in Khost Province, Afghanistan. It was the birthplace of Zadian chieftain Babrak Khan, and the winter home of his son, Mazrak Zadran. A report in 1980 described the Almara villagers as people who considered it polite to squat when one is taking a meal or when one is in the presence of his or her elderly relatives.

References 

Populated places in Khost Province